Neodasys is a genus of gastrotrichs in the class Chaetonotida. It is the only genus in the family Neodasyidae, which is the only family in the suborder Multitubulatina.

Species
Neodasys chaetonotoideus Remane, 1927
Neodasys cirritus Evans, 1992
Neodasys uchidai Remane, 1961

References

Gastrotricha
Platyzoa genera